Andreas Stadler (born 1965 in Muerzzuschlag, Austria) is a leading Austrian diplomat, curator, writer, lecturer, political scientist. He was the director of the Austrian Cultural Forum in New York City from 2007 to 2013. In fall of 2013 he returned to Vienna to work at the Ministry for Foreign Affairs. He was also appointed Guest Professor at the Vienna University of Applied Arts to teach Cultural Diplomacy and international arts relations.

Andreas Stadler studied political science at the University of Vienna in Austria, and at the European University Institute in Florence, Italy. After graduation, he joined the Federal Ministry for European and International Affairs of Austria as a diplomat. From 1995 to 1999 he served as Deputy Ambassador in Zagreb, Croatia and from 1999 to 2004 he was the director of the Austrian Cultural Forum in Warsaw,  Poland. After leaving Warsaw in 2004 he became the advisor for science, arts and culture to the President of the Republic of Austria and held the position until 2007, when he was appointed director of the Austrian Cultural Forum in New York.

Publications 
Andreas Stadler has published essays on issues related to European politics, cultural policies, and the politics of art in various Austrian and Polish newspapers and magazines. Among others:

"Kulturpolitik und Demokratie /Cultural policies and democracy“, Austrian magazine of political science, 3/2006, Vienna (co-edited by Monika Mokre)
"Das neue Polen in Europa / The new Poland in Europe“, Studienverlag Innsbruck, 2006 (co-edited with Holzhacker, Merli, Wagner)
"More Europe, More Culture – Foreign Cultural Policies in and Beyond Europe“, Warsaw 2005, Adam Mickiewicz Institute, (co-edited with Burka, Zoltaniecki)
"Polen – Österreich: eine vergessene Freundschaft / Poland – Austria: A forgotten friendship", in: Europäische Rundschau, Vienna 2004
“Under Pain of Death", Exhibition catalogue, New York 2008
"Bread and Soccer", Exhibition catalogue, New York 2008
"The Seen and the Hidden: Discovering the Veil", Exhibition catalogue, Wiener Zeitung Edition Atelier, New York 2009
"Selbstzensur aus Respekt", in: Datum: Seiten der Zeit, Heft 78/09
"Raimund Abraham and the Austrian Cultural Forum New York", Hatje Cantz Verlag, Ostfildern 2010
"NineTeenEightyFour", Exhibition catalogue, Wiener Zeitung Edition Atelier, New York 2010
"1989 - End of History or Beginning of the Future", Exhibition catalogue, Wiener Zeitung Edition Atelier, New York 2010
"FAQ Serbia Frequently Asked Questions", Exhibition catalogue, Wiener Zeitung Edition Atelier, New York 2010
"Disturbing Arts and Politics in Austria", in: Viennese Actionism: The Opposite Pole of Society. Works from the Essl Collection, Krakow 2011
"Alpine Desire", Exhibition catalogue, Passagen Verlag, New York 2012
"Beauty Contest", Exhibition catalogue, Passagen Verlag, New York 2012
"Fünf Räume", Domig, Hollerer, Komad/Kienzer/Ruhry/Stocker, Passagen Verlag, Wien, 2013
"Our Haus“, Verlag Anton Pustet Salzburg, 2013

External links 
Hofburg Austria (in German)
Austrian Cultural Forum Warsaw (in German and Polish)
Austrian Cultural Forum New York
The New York Times (3 March 1999) - 'Croatia Branded as Another Balkans Pariah'
The Warsaw Voice online (27 April 2004) - 'Honorary Varsovian'
The New York Times (13 August 2009) - 'Multilayered and Multicultural, Creative Views of the Muslim Head Scarf'
The New York Times (19 August 2010) - 'The Lights of Big Brother’s Eyes, Blinking in the City'
Art in America (18 October 2010) - 'A Question of Fever'
The New York Times (24 March 2012) - 'In Europe, Where Art Is Life, Ax Falls on Public Financing'
Critical Strategies in Art and Media
Die besseren Klischees (in German)
Wir sind das kreative Aushängeschild (in German)
Kulturforum hat laut Direktor Österreich verändert (in German)
The Powerful Women of Dance (in German)

Austrian political scientists
1965 births
Living people